An Equity Linked Savings Scheme, popularly known as ELSS, is a type of diversified equity scheme which comes, with a lock-in period of three years, offered by mutual funds in India. They offer tax benefits under the Section 80C of Income Tax Act 1961. ELSSes can be invested using both SIP (Systematic Investment Plan) and lump sums investment options. There is a three years lock-in period, and thus has better liquidity compared to other options like NSC and Public Provident Fund. Mutual funds are subjective to fluctuations in the market. There were many instances where the money you invested is the same or even lesser after 3 years in a mutual fund.

See also
 National Pension System (NPS)
 Mutual fund
 Income tax in India

References

Tax-advantaged savings plans in India